Luca Rizzoli (born 3 May 2002) is an Italian professional rugby union player who primarily plays prop for Zebre Parma of the United Rugby Championship.

Professional career 
Rizzoli previously played for clubs such as Capitolina. He signed for Zebre Parma in May 2022 ahead of the 2022–23 United Rugby Championship as Academy Player.

In 2021 and 2022 Rizzoli was named in Italy U20s squad for annual Six Nations Under 20s Championship.

References

External links

Living people
Italian rugby union players
Zebre Parma players
Rugby union props
2002 births
Sportspeople from Rome